Billa II is the soundtrack album, composed by Yuvan Shankar Raja, for the 2012 film of the same name, directed by Chakri Toleti that stars Ajith Kumar as the title character. The album consists of six tracks; five songs and a theme music track. Na. Muthukumar penned all lyrics for the songs.

Production
Although a new director (Chakri Toleti) was chosen to direct the prequel, Yuvan Shankar Raja, who had worked on the score of Billa (2007), was retained as the composer of Billa II, which became his fifth project starring Ajith Kumar. The soundtrack album was reported to feature six tracks, including one promotional video song. It consists of five songs and a theme music track, an altered version of the original 2007 Billa theme. Yuvan Shankar Raja had composed a sixth song for a belly dance sequence, which was not included in the soundtrack, but featured only in the film. Na. Muthukumar agreed to write the lyrics, replacing Pa. Vijay who had worked on Billa'''s lyrics. In a departure from convention, the lyrics were penned first which were set to tunes later.

Yuvan Shankar Raja revealed in 2014 told that he tried to recruit Shakira for the project but failed because of "budget troubles". In late January 2012, Yuvan Shankar Raja left for Florida, US, Chakri's home place, to finish the compositions. During the trip, he had composed a "melody song". Singer Krish informed via Twitter that he had lent his voice for a R&B style song that would be the introduction track of the protagonist, while Shweta Pandit was reported to have performed one song, too. However, Krish's version was later replaced by Yuvan Shankar himself. Re-recording works began by May 2012 in Mumbai.

Release
The audio launch was initially to be released in mid-March 2012, but was then pushed to second week of April. Actor Rajinikanth was approached to unveil the soundtrack, with the team supposedly rescheduling the audio launch to suit Rajinikanth's dates, who had left for London for the filming of his film Kochadaiyaan. The soundtrack was unveiled on 1 May 2012, coinciding with Ajith Kumar's birthday. Sony Music Entertainment that marketed the album of Ajith Kumar's previous film Mankatha, acquired the music rights of Billa II'' as well for an unprecedented sum after some weeks-long negotiations. In the week before the audio launch, Sony Music began releasing teasers of each of the songs every day and promoted them across social platforms. The Telugu version of the soundtrack was released on 5 June 2012 at the Taj Deccan in Hyderabad.

Reception
Rediff's Pavithra Srinivasan gave it 3 stars out of 5 and went to add that Yuvan Shankar Raja had "infused certain freshness to the music", describing it as "quite promising".

Track listing 
Billa 2 Song Lyrics

Personnel

Instruments
 Live Drums & Percussion: V. Kumar
 Flute: Napoleon
 Veena: Devi
 Sitar: Ganesh
 Nadaswaram: Thirumoorthy
 Electric Guitar: Kabuli & Joshwa
 Tabla: L. V. Prasad, Prasad, Madhu, V.Ramana, Neelu, Venkat Balu, Venkatrao, Shruti
 Tavil: Sundar
 Female Harmony: Surmuki, Priya, Priyadharshini, Anitha

Production
 Program Manager: V. Karthik
 Program Co-ordination: A. S. Subbiah
 Recorded at: Prasad Studios & S.a.s.i Studios, Chennai
 Recorded by: M.Kumaraguruparan, Baranidharan & Prabhakar
 Theme Music mixed by M.Kumaraguruparan
 Theme Music mastered at Studio N.Y.S.A. Mumbai
 Theme Music mastered by Murali
 Mixed at nHow Studios, Berlin, Germany
 Mixed by Kausikan Sivalingam & Özgür İkinci
 Mastered at Masterlab Berlin

References 

Yuvan Shankar Raja soundtracks
2012 soundtrack albums
Sony Music India soundtracks
Tamil film soundtracks